Sternarchogiton is a genus of weakly electric knifefish in the family Apteronotidae, with four known species, all living in the main channel of large rivers in the Amazon and Orinoco basins in South America.

The adult males of S. nattereri have teeth on the outside of the jaw, believed to be used in fights with other males, and it was formerly placed in its own genus because of this unique feature. Sternarchogiton are distinguished from other apteronotid genera by details of the skull and the broad descending blades of the pterygiophores in the anal fin. They are related to the genera Adontosternarchus and Porotergus.

Species
There are four recognized species:

 Sternarchogiton labiatus de Santana & Crampton, 2007
 Sternarchogiton nattereri (Steindachner, 1868)	 
 Sternarchogiton porcinum C. H. Eigenmann & W. R. Allen, 1942
 Sternarchogiton zuanoni de Santana & Vari, 2010

References

Apteronotidae
Fish of South America
Freshwater fish genera
Taxa named by Carl H. Eigenmann